Orgie may refer to:

Orgy, with Orgie being an alternative form. Plural orgies
Orgi-E (born 1979), Danish rapper and member of Suspekt

See also
Orgia, religious rites in ancient Greece
Orgie des Todes